Vanuatu competed at the 2019 World Aquatics Championships in Gwangju, South Korea from 12 to 28 July 2019.

Swimming

Vanuatu entered one swimmer.

Men

References

Nations at the 2019 World Aquatics Championships
Vanuatu at the World Aquatics Championships
2019 in Vanuatuan sport